Vietnam National Reinsurance Corporation (Vinare), established in 1995, is Vietnam's key reinsurance company.  Its offices are located in Hanoi.

In 2006, Vinare became the first publicly quoted financial firm in the country. It was the 10th firm to trade on the Hanoi Securities Trading Center; its symbol is VNR.

External links
Vietnam re-insurer's shares could double at IPO, Thanhnien News, 7 March 2006
Vinare's page at Hanoi Securities Trading Center

Financial services companies established in 1995
Companies based in Hanoi
Companies listed on the Hanoi Stock Exchange
Insurance companies of Vietnam
Reinsurance companies
Economy of Hanoi
Vietnamese brands